This is a list of Dutch television related events from 1966.

Events
5 February - Milly Scott is selected to represent Netherlands at the 1966 Eurovision Song Contest with her song "Fernando en Filippo". She is selected to be the eleventh Dutch Eurovision entry during Nationaal Songfestival held at Tivoli in Utrecht.

Debuts

Television shows

1950s
NOS Journaal (1956–present)
Pipo de Clown (1958-1980)

1960s
Stiefbeen en Zoon (1964-1971)

Ending this year

Births
19 November - Esther Duller, TV presenter

Deaths